The Battles of Dunajetz occurred in May 1915 as part of the Gorlice–Tarnów Offensive during World War I. They were fought between  the Russians (who were camped out along the line of the Dunajec river, the right tributary of the Vistula) and a force led by German General August von Mackensen to push the Russians out of Galicia and Vistula land (what is now Poland).

Background 

From August 1914 until early spring 1915, the Central powers prioritized war on the Western front to their Eastern front. This allowed Russian troops to steadily advance through Galicia, taking the Austrian territory, including the Hungarian fortress of Przemysl in March and seizing its weapons stores. Progress was not easy, though and the Russian Imperial Army suffered heavy casualties. No matter how hard they were hit, they managed to recover so quickly that Prince von Bulow reportedly once said, "fighting the Russians [was] like pounding a pillow.".

As a result of the Russian advance into Austria and chatter that Italy (which was neutral) was preparing to enter the war on the side of the Allies,  the situation was seen as dire for the Austrian-Hungarian empire. The Central Powers reorganized their armies and Field Marshall von Hindenburg who believed that Russia "could be defeated in a single campaign, provided enough troops were at hand"  gave Mackensen command of the newly created German Eleventh Army with Colonel Hans von Seeckt as his Chief of Staff. He had two million men, 4,000 guns and operational control over the Austro-Hungarian Third and Fourth Armies stationed in Galicia.

Battle 
The Russian Third Army, under the command of Nikolay Iudovich Ivanov was camped along the Dunajetz river, paused to regroup and resupply
Mackensen, who had been ordered to break the Russian line attacked them on 1 May with an intense artillery bombardment that lasted four hours and used 70,000 shells. This was followed up by an infantry assault. By noon of the first day, Mackensen captured the first lines of Russian soldiers. 
The next day, Prince Leopold of Bavaria's Ninth Army launched an attack with chlorine gas that had mixed results, with shifting winds carrying some of the gas back to unprotected German soldiers.

The Central forces broke a ten-mile gap in the Russian line and took the city of Tarnów. They pressed the Imperial Army to chaotically retreat, with additional battles breaking out on 3 and 7 May. By 11 May the Russians began a full retreat to a prepared position along the San River. Wherever they could, they sought to engage the Central forces in delaying or exhaustive skirmishes. They two armies reached the San rivers on 14 May, thus ending the Battles of Dunajetz. The Central Powers had advanced about 80 miles.

By 11 May, it was clear that the Germans and Austro-Hungarians had numeric and tactical strength and so the Russians began a full retreat to a prepared position along the San river. Wherever they could, they sought to engage the Central forces in delaying or exhaustive skirmishes. They two armies reached the San rivers on 14 May, thus ending the Battles of Dunajetz, but continuing the successful Gorlice-Tarnow Offensive.

Parallel developments 
While Mackensen directed his troops against the Russians along the Dunajetz, Hindenburg occupied Russian forces in northern Poland and Kurland, so they could not be sent as reinforcements. Also, due to Russian attention being drawn to their line further south, Hindenburg moved to attack Warsaw.

Outcome 

The Central Powers had a number of military advantages going into this offensive. They were numerically and technologically superior. In addition, air superiority allowed them to carry out careful reconnaissance of Russian positions and well as drop bombs on the Russian trenches.

The German focus, at this time, was to break Russian morale and take the sector of land between Gorlice and Tarnow. This would enable them to march on Przemyśl Fortress from the North and join the Austro-Hungarians approaching from the East and southeast. They certainly succeeded in doing so. By the end of May, the Russians had been pushed back to the Carpathian mountains.
However, the Battle of Dunajetz did not end in any conclusive way.

References

External links

Conflicts in 1915
Battles of the Eastern Front (World War I)
Battles of World War I involving Russia
Battles of World War I involving Germany
May 1915 events